Louis Barré (born 6 April 2000) is a French cyclist, who currently rides for UCI ProTeam .

Major results
2017
 1st Mountains classification, Ronde des Vallées
 8th Bernaudeau Junior
 9th Overall Tour du Pays de Vaud
2018
 3rd Road race, National Junior Road Championships
 4th Gent–Wevelgem Juniors
 8th Bernaudeau Junior
2019
 10th Overall Ronde de l'Oise
2021
 4th Liège–Bastogne–Liège U23
 7th Road race, European Under-23 Road Championships
2022
 7th Tour du Finistère
 9th Overall Boucles de la Mayenne
2023
 8th Trofeo Andratx–Mirador D'es Colomer

References

External links

2000 births
Living people
French male cyclists
21st-century French people